Mirco Scarantino (born 16 January 1995) is an Italian weightlifter, two time Olympian and three time European Champion competing in the 56 kg category until 2018 and 55 kg starting in 2018 after the International Weightlifting Federation reorganized the categories.

Career

Olympics
He competed at the 2012 Summer Olympics in the Men's 56 kg, finishing 14th  and at the 2016 Summer Olympics in the Men's 56 kg, finishing 7th.

World Championships
After competing at the World Weightlifting Championships since 2013, he won his first medal at the 2018 World Weightlifting Championships.

Major results

References

External links
 

1995 births
Living people
People from San Cataldo, Sicily
Italian male weightlifters
Olympic weightlifters of Italy
Weightlifters at the 2012 Summer Olympics
Weightlifters at the 2016 Summer Olympics
World Weightlifting Championships medalists
Mediterranean Games silver medalists for Italy
Mediterranean Games medalists in weightlifting
Competitors at the 2013 Mediterranean Games
Weightlifters of Fiamme Oro
European Weightlifting Championships medalists
Sportspeople from the Province of Caltanissetta
21st-century Italian people